SNS College of Engineering (AUTONOMOUS) (SNSEngg), in Coimbatore, Tamil Nadu, India, is a private self-financing engineering institute. The college is approved by AICTE and is affiliated to the Anna University. It was established in 2007 and has started its second batch of students enjoying a total intake of nearly 852 students.

Academics
The college offers eight courses leading to the Degree of Bachelor of Engineering (B.E.) and two courses leading to Bachelor of Technology (B.Tech.). PG courses are M.E/M.Tech/Master of Business Administration (MBA) of Anna University Coimbatore.

Undergraduate courses

B.E.
Computer Science and Engineering (CSE)
Computer Science and Engineering - Internet of Things with Cyber Security & BlockChain(CSE -IoT -Cyber Sec/BlockChain)
Computer Science and Technology (CST)
Mechatronics and Mechanical Engineering (Additive Manufacturing) (MCT - AM)
Computer Science and Design (CSD)
Mechanical Engineering (MECH)
Electronics and Communication Engineering (ECE)
Electrical and Electronics Engineering (EEE)
Civil Engineering (Lateral)
B.Tech
Information Technology (IT)
Artificial Intelligence & Data Science (AI & DS)

PG courses

Master of Business Administration (MBA)
M.E. Computer Science and Engineering
M.E. Embedded System Technology
M.E. Power Electronics and Drives
M.Tech, Information Technology
M.E Manufacturing Engineering

Admission procedure
The undergraduate students are admitted based on their 12th standard (higher secondary school) scores. The admissions are done as per the government of Tamil Nadu norms through State Government Counselling (TNEA) and through regulated management seat procedures.

Sports
SNSEngg hosts multi-purpose grounds and student activity center(SPINE). The following sports are available:
Swimming Pool
Cricket
Badminton
Hockey
Volleyball
Kabbadi
Kho Kho
Table tennis
Tennis
Chess
Carrom
Basketball
Fives Football

References

External links
SNSEngg official website
SPINE official website
Official photo gallery
Official blog
About Coimbatore City

Engineering colleges in Coimbatore
Private engineering colleges in Tamil Nadu